John James Gorman (7 April 1882 – after 1909) was an English footballer who played for Stoke and Wolverhampton Wanderers.

Career
Gorman was born in Dudley and began his career with Wolverhampton Wanderers. He scored twice on his debut in a 7–0 victory over Derby County on 21 April 1906. He scored twice more in 1906–07 before leaving for Halesowen Town. He then joined Stoke in 1908 and played 17 times for the "Potters" in 1908–09 scoring seven goals. He left at the end of the season to play for his hometown club Dudley Town.

Career statistics
Source:

References

1882 births
Year of death missing
Sportspeople from Dudley
Association football inside forwards
English footballers
Wolverhampton Wanderers F.C. players
Halesowen Town F.C. players
Stoke City F.C. players
Dudley Town F.C. players
English Football League players